The seventeenth season of the American competitive reality television series Hell's Kitchen (officially known as Hell's Kitchen All Stars) began airing on September 29, 2017, and ended on February 2, 2018, on Fox. This is the first season in Hell's Kitchen history to have an all star edition as sixteen former contestants from previous seasons return to compete once again (also their first time since season eight returned to 16 contestants, instead of 18), and the winner of this season will receive the position as head chef at the first-ever Gordon Ramsay Hell's Kitchen Restaurant at Caesars Palace in Las Vegas, Nevada. All of the returning chefs made it onto the Black Jackets in their respective seasons. Gordon Ramsay returned as host and head chef, season 10 winner (and season 15 sous-chef)  Christina Wilson returned as the Red Team's sous-chef replacing Andi Van Willigan-Cutspec, and British MasterChef judge James "Jocky" Petrie made his Hell's Kitchen debut as the Blue Team's sous-chef replacing Aaron Mitrano. Marino Monferrato returned as the maître d'. 

The season was won by season 14 third place finisher Michelle Tribble, with season seven third place finisher Benjamin Knack finishing second and season 14 fifth place finisher Nick Peters Bond placing third.

Chefs
16 returning chefs competed in Season 17.

Notes

Contestant progress

Episodes

U.S. Nielsen ratings

References

Hell's Kitchen (American TV series)
2017 American television seasons
2018 American television seasons